Menshikov is a Russian masculine surname, its feminine counterpart is Menshikova. It may refer to:

Aleksandr Danilovich Menshikov (1673–1729), Russian statesman
Aleksandr Sergeyevich Menshikov (1787–1869), Finnish-Russian nobleman, military commander and statesman
Alexei Menshikov (born 1984), Russian pair skater
Maria Menshikova (1711–1729), daughter of Aleksandr Danilovich and a favourite of Peter I of Russia
Mikhail Menshikov (born 1948), Russian-British mathematician
Nina Menshikova (1928–2007), Soviet actress
Oleg Menshikov (born 1960), Russian actor
Stanislav Menshikov (1927–2014), Russian economist and diplomat
Vitali Menshikov (born 1989), Russian ice hockey player

Russian-language surnames